Little Britain Township is a township in southeastern Lancaster County, Pennsylvania, United States. The population was 4,134 at the 2020 census. It is part of the Solanco School District.

History
On February 7, 1738, a petition was signed by many citizens of Drumore Township, Pennsylvania to create a new township, due to Drumore getting too big. They had a hard time thinking of a new name, though finally John Jamison, one of the oldest and most prominent citizens, proposed that it be called Little Britain Township in memory of most of the settlers' mother country. For over one hundred years, Little Britain Township's boundaries remained unchanged, until 1844 when Fulton Township was formed.  Although Robert Fulton, credited with the development of the steamship, was born in Little Britain, his birthplace is within the border of present-day Fulton Township.

The Kirks Mills Historic District and Pine Grove Covered Bridge are listed on the National Register of Historic Places.

Geography
It includes the unincorporated communities of Little Britain, Kings Bridge, Fairmount, White Rock, Oak Shade, Tayloria, Pine Grove, Oak Hill, Oakryn, Summerhill, Kirks Bridge, Kirks Mills, Eastland, and part of Wrightsdale.

Demographics
As of the census of 2000, there were 3,514 people, 1,115 households, and 931 families residing in the township.  The population density was 128.3 people per square mile (49.5/km2).  There were 1,156 housing units at an average density of 42.2/sq mi (16.3/km2).  The racial makeup of the township was 98.12% White, 0.65% African American, 0.03% Native American, 0.23% Asian, 0.11% from other races, and 0.85% from two or more races. Hispanic or Latino of any race were 1.20% of the population.

There were 1,115 households, out of which 44.5% had children under the age of 18 living with them, 73.5% were married couples living together, 5.5% had a female householder with no husband present, and 16.5% were non-families. 13.3% of all households were made up of individuals, and 4.9% had someone living alone who was 65 years of age or older.  The average household size was 3.15 and the average family size was 3.47.

In the township the population was spread out, with 33.7% under the age of 18, 8.0% from 18 to 24, 28.8% from 25 to 44, 21.1% from 45 to 64, and 8.3% who were 65 years of age or older.  The median age was 32 years. For every 100 females, there were 100.9 males.  For every 100 females age 18 and over, there were 100.5 males.

The median income for a household in the township was $50,017, and the median income for a family was $51,549. Males had a median income of $42,063 versus $25,694 for females. The per capita income for the township was $18,563.  About 8.8% of families and 13.6% of the population were below the poverty line, including 19.5% of those under age 18 and 2.7% of those age 65 or over.

Politics
As of the 2020 election, no Democratic Party nominee for president has ever won Little Britain dating back to Andrew Jackson's second campaign in 1828. Every presidential ticket nominated by the GOP has carried Little Britain, Pennsylvania, with five of the last six tickets winning the township with over 70% of the vote. Six of the seven Whig tickets carried the town as well, with that party not being put on the ballot in Pennsylvania in 1832. The Anti-Masonic party nominee William Wirt won the township in that election. 

The best showing by a Republican to date is Herbert Hoover in 1928. The best showing by a Democrat is the 48.99% won by Winfield S. Hancock in 1880. He lost by eight votes. In 1856, Lancaster native James Buchanan was the Democratic nominee and received 39.94% of the vote.

Presidential election results since 1812 except for 1820 are all presented below:

References

External links

Populated places established in 1714
Townships in Lancaster County, Pennsylvania
Townships in Pennsylvania
1714 establishments in Pennsylvania